The 1927 All-Eastern football team consists of American football players chosen by various selectors as the best players at each position among the Eastern colleges and universities during the 1927 college football season. 

Four players received first-team All-Eastern honors and were also consensus first-team All-Americans: halfback Gibby Welch of Pittsburgh; tackle Ed Hake of Penn; guard Bill Webster; and center John Charlesworth of Yale. Sprague was later inducted into the College Football Hall of Fame.

All-Eastern selections

Quarterbacks
 Jack Connor, NYU (AP-1, UP-1)

Halfbacks
 Gibby Welch, Pittsburgh (AP-1, UP-1)
 Alton Marsters, Dartmouth (AP-1, UP-1)

Fullbacks
 Bill Amos, Washington & Jefferson (AP-1, UP-1)

Ends
 Stewart Scott, Yale (AP-1, UP-1)
 George Cole, Dartmouth (AP-1)
 Charles Born, Army (UP-1)

Tackles
 Bud Sprague, Army (AP-1, UP-1)
 Ed Hake, Penn (AP-1, UP-1)

Guards
 Bill Webster, Yale (AP-1, UP-1)
 Bruce Dumont, Colgate (AP-1)
 Cervini, Holy Cross (UP-1)

Centers
 Claude Grisby, Georgetown (AP-1)
 John Charlesworth, Yale (UP-1)

Key
 AP = Associated Press, selected from opinions of 56 critics, sport writers, and officials in the East
 UP = United Press

See also
 1927 College Football All-America Team

References

All-Eastern
All-Eastern college football teams